Kanyakumari Express is a 2010 Malayalam police procedural thriller film directed by T S Suresh Babu, starring Suresh Gopi, Lena, Babu Antony, Sarayu and debutant Gowri Nandha as the heroine.

Premise
Kanyakumari Express revolves around DIG Mohan Sanker IPS, who loses his wife and children in an accident, where he shifts his job to Special Branch for a calm life. With change in his duty, Mohan Sanker is welcomed by some politicians, but he is actually working undercover, and also did research on temples of Kerala and Nanchinad. During this period, the politicians began to die mysteriously and the CM Keshavan Nambiar misunderstands Mohan Sanker for the killings. With this, Mohan Sanker begins to investigate the murders.

Cast
Suresh Gopi as DIG Mohan Shanker IPS, later promoted as IG
Babu Antony as Ranjan Philip
Jagathy Sreekumar as Keshavan Nambiar
Gowri Nandha as Hanna John
Lena as Sneha Mohan Shanker
Shanavas as Satharam Sethu
Maneesh Krishna as Arjun Satharam
Bheeman Raghu as DGP Raghuram
 Kanakalatha as Meera Bhayi
Sarayu as Hema
Dinesh Panicker as Adv. John
Sabu Varghese as Rajashekharan
Krishna as Ajay Nambiyar
Tosh Christy as Alex
Achu as Achu
Kiran Raj as Rasheed
Baiju as SI Stephen Varghese
Sudheer Sukumaran as DySP Thirunnalveli Muthuvel
Urmila Unni - Cameo Appearance
Kottayam Nazeer - Cameo Appearance
Rajmohan Unnithan -Law Minister Cameo Appearance

References

External links
 OneIndia article
 MalluMovies article

2010 films
Films scored by Sharreth
2010 crime thriller films
2010s Malayalam-language films
Films directed by T. S. Suresh Babu
Indian crime thriller films
Fictional portrayals of the Kerala Police
Fictional portrayals of the Tamil Nadu Police
Films shot in Thiruvananthapuram